is a song by Japanese rock band Godiego, serving as the band's 12th single. "Holy and Bright" was used as the second ending theme for the television drama Saiyūki, known in the west as Monkey, and ultimately reached number 17 on the Oricon and number 8 on The Best Tens charts.

Track listing

"Holy and Bright" (English Version)

1979 singles
Godiego songs
Japanese television drama theme songs
1979 songs
Songs written by Yukihide Takekawa
Songs written by Yoko Narahashi